On July 6, 1820, James Pindall (F) resigned from his position as Representative for .  A special election was held to fill the resulting vacancy.

Election results

Jackson took his seat on November 13, 1820

See also
List of special elections to the United States House of Representatives

References

Virginia 1820 01
Virginia 1820 01
1820 01
Virginia 01
United States House of Representatives 01
United States House of Representatives 1820 01